Melaleuca polandii, commonly known as gold-tipped bottlebrush, is a plant in the myrtle family, Myrtaceae and is endemic a small area in far northern Queensland in Australia. (Some Australian state herbaria continue to use the name Callistemon polandii.) It is a dense shrub with bronze-coloured, hairy new growth and spikes of red flowers tipped with yellow.

Description
The leaves have a distinct mid-vein and 19 to 25 lateral veins. The young leaves and branches are covered with fine, silky hairs.

The flowers are bright red and are arranged in spikes on the ends of branches that continue to grow after flowering and sometimes in the upper leaf axils.

Taxonomy and naming
Melaleuca polandii was first named in 2006 by Lyndley Craven in Novon when Callistemon polandii was transferred to the present genus. Callistemon polandii was first formally described in 1902 by Frederick Manson Bailey from a specimen collected in "Bloomfield River [by] Rev. W. Poland". The specific epithet (polandii) honours Wilhelm Poland, a missionary at Wujal Wujal (formerly the Bloomfield River Mission).

Callistemon polandii is regarded as a synonym of Melaleuca polandii by the Royal Botanic Gardens, Kew.

Distribution and habitat
This melaleuca occurs in the Cape Flattery and Cooktown districts of Queensland where it grows in dense wallum heath in sandy or peaty soils.

Use in horticulture
Melaleuca polandii is a hardy shrub, suitable for warm coastal areas. It is useful as a screen or hedge but is known to damage wastewater pipes.

References

polandii
Flora of Queensland
Plants described in 1902